is a Japanese television jidaigeki or period drama that was broadcast from 1974 to 1975. It is based on Shōtarō Ikenami's novel by the same title. It depicts the stories of Tsukimori Jūbei and the Forty-seven rōnin. A remake was aired in 1997 on Fuji television.

Plot
Tsukimori Jūbei is an Onmitsu(Oniwaban). He and Masafuyu Nakane help Forty-seven rōnin′s revenge. On the other hand, Kobayashi Haihachi attempts to stop it and protect Kira Yoshinaka in various ways by Uesugi Noritsuna's(Kira Yoshinaka's son.) order.

In addition, Funazu challenges Jūbei to a duel again and again, and tries to kill Jūbei persistently.

Characters 
 Hideki Takahashi : Tsukimori Jūbei (Amigasa  Jūbei)
 Shigeru Tsuyuguchi : Heyhachi kobayashi
 Mikio Narita : Funazu Yakurō is a ruthless ronin.
 Yutaka Nakajima : Senya
 Goichi Yamada as Horibe Yasubei
 Takeya Nakamura : Ōishi Yoshio 
 Go Wakabayashi : Fuwa Kazuemon
 Yoichi Hayashi : Kayano Sanpei
 Yumiko Nogawa : Kaoru
 Susumu Kurobe :Nagai/Osu
 Taeko Hattori : Yae
 Isamu Nagato : Tawaraboshi Genba
 Yuko Hama : Minae
 Jūkei Fujioka : Nagao Kanbei
 Tatsuo Endō : Kajikawa Yoriteru
 Yoko Hayama : Oshun
 Yoshio Inaba : Uchida Saburozaemon
 Akira Nakao : Tada Dempachiro
 Hiroko Fuji : Shizue
 Yoshi Katō : Kayano Hichirozaemon
 Eiji Okada : Yanagisawa Yoshiyasu
 Yūnosuke Itō  : Kira Yoshinaka 
 Ryūtarō Ōtomo : Okuda Magodayou
 Chiezō Kataoka : Nakane Masafuyu

Episodes
1, Tosho directed by Tokuzō Tanaka 
2, Seppuku directed by Tokuzō Tanaka
3, Ketsudan directed by Masatake Matsuo
4, Shugeki directed by Masatake Mastuo
5, Zansatsu directed by Masahiko Izawa
6, Tsuioku directed by Masahiko Izawa
7, Shikyaku directed by Masatake Matsuo
8, Shuppu directed by Masatake Matsuo
9, Enjō directed by Kazuo Ikehiro
10, Bojō directed by Kazuo Ikehiro
11, Datsuraku directed by Masatake Matsuo
12, Danatsu directed by Masatake Matsuo
13, Kuromaku directed by Masatake Matsuo
14, Sennyu directed by Masatake Matsuo
15, Giwaku directed by Masatake Matsuo
16, Tsuiseki directed by Tokuzō Tanaka
17, Kenshin directed by Tokuzō Tanaka
18,  Bōky directed by Tokuzō Tanaka
19, Hidō directed by Masatake Matsuo
20, Shikon directed by Masatake Matsuo
21, Bōryaku directed by Masahiko Izawa
22, Chusedtsu directed by Masahiko Izawa
23, Kansei directed by Buichi Saitō
24, Zenya directed by Masahiko Izawa
25, Uchiiri directed by Masatake Matsuo
26, Ketsubetsu directed by Masatake Matsuo

References

1974 Japanese television series debuts
1970s drama television series
Jidaigeki television series
Television shows based on Japanese novels
Television series set in the 17th century